Farewell My Concubine may refer to:

 The Hegemon-King Bids His Concubine Farewell, a traditional Chinese opera
 Farewell My Concubine (novel), a novel by Lilian Lee
 Farewell My Concubine (film), a film by Chen Kaige, based on the novel by Lilian Lee
 Farewell My Concubine (modern opera), a Western-style Chinese opera by Xiao Bai which toured America in 2008